Felix da Housecat (born Felix Stallings Jr., August 25, 1971) is an American DJ and record producer, mostly known for house music and electro. Felix is regarded as a member of the second wave of Chicago house.

Musical career

Early life
Stallings developed an interest in the emergent Chicago house music scene at a young age. While a student at Rich East High School in Park Forest, Illinois in the mid-1980s, a chance introduction to acid house pioneer DJ Pierre gave the then 15-year-old Stallings his break, and under the patronage and guidance of Pierre, he released his first single, "Phantasy Girl," in 1987.

Also in 1987, Felix went to Alabama State University to study media and communication. There he studied different musicians of the era, including Prince, A Tribe Called Quest, and Gang Starr, as well as developing an interest in hip hop and R&B tracks.

1990s
After graduating, he released "Thee Dawn" on Guerilla Records. He became popular in Europe, and in the following year, "By Dawn's Early Light" and "Thee Industry Made Me Do It" followed. A further single, "In The Dark We Live (Thee Lite)", appeared under his pseudonym, Aphrohead. Originally released on the UK label, Bush, "In The DaAlbum", followed in 1998. In 1999, he released "In The Dark We Live".

Shortly afterwards, Stallings formed Radikal Fear Records. It released material from Mike Dunn, DJ Sneak, and Armando as well as Felix himself. During 1995, he released his debut album Alone in the Dark (as Thee Maddkatt Courtship) on Deep Distraxion, followed by the Radikal Fear compilation album, The Chicago All Stars and a remix album entitled Clashbackk Compilation Mix. The album I Know Electrikboy was never officially released in either the US or UK, although promotional copies are in circulation.

2000s
In 2001, Kittenz and Thee Glitz, written and produced alongside Tommie Sunshine, Miss Kittin, Dave The Hustler, Harrison Crump, Junior Sanchez, Junior Jack and Melistar, was released which gained Felix mainstream exposure. At the end of that year, Felix won Best Album at the now-defunct Muzik Awards. The ensuing fame brought Felix remix work for Madonna, Britney Spears and Kylie Minogue. The proper follow-up, Devin Dazzle & the Neon Fever, was released in 2004, though Felix released a pair of mix albums, 2002's Excursions and 2003's A Bugged Out Mix, in between.

Felix also collaborated with P Diddy on the pair's "Jack U" single. The pair remain friends, with Diddy performing alongside Felix at Space in Ibiza in 2005, and Felix performing at Diddy's after-party for The Main Event at the Winter Music Conference.

Various remixes of "Silver Screen Shower Scene" were used in video games such as Midnight Club 2, and SSX 3. The Soulwax Remix of his song "Rocket Ride" was featured in the game Need for Speed: Underground 2. "Everyone Is Someone in LA" was featured in Tony Hawk's American Wasteland.  His songs have also featured in television programs such as The Sopranos and "Silver Screen Shower Scene" featured in the party scene in Shane Black's 2005 film, Kiss Kiss Bang Bang.

Felix's album, Virgo Blaktro and the Movie Disco, was released on October 2, 2007, in the US on Nettwerk Records. Production was overseen by Dallas Austin.

"Future Calls The Dawn" was released on July 9, 2007, on Wall of Sound/PIAS with "Sweetfrosti" featured as the B-side. "Sweetfrosti" contained a sample of Devo's "Snowball", originally released in 1981.

"Like Something 4 Porno!" was released as the album's lead single on September 24, 2007, with remixes from Kris Menace, Teenage Bad Girl and Armand Van Helden, while a third single, "Radio", was released digitally in April 2008. Since then, Felix has released his first Global Underground compilation, for the Newcastle-upon-Tyne compilation and club label. Felix also teamed up with Kris Menace to release "Artificial" in June 2008.

In 2009, Felix released He Was King, via Nettwerk Records.

Discography

Studio albums

Mix albums

Singles

Remixes
Passion Pit – "Little Secrets (Felix Da Housecat Pink Enemy Remix)" (2009)
Britney Spears – "Toxic (Felix Da Housecat's Club Mix)" (2004)
Buy Now! – "For Sale (Felix Da Housecat Remix)" (2007)
Ladytron – "Playgirl (Felix Da Housecat Glitz Club Mix)" (2001)
The Chemical Brothers – "Get Yourself High (Felix Da Housecat's Chemical Meltdown Mix)" (2003)
The Disco Boys – "Born to Be Alive (Felix Da Housecat's Chicago Tracky Glitz Remix)" (2001)
Garbage – "Androgyny (Thee Glitz mix)" & "Androgyny (Thee Drum Drum mix)" (2001)
Gwen Stefani – "What You Waiting For? (The Rude Ho Mix by Felix Da Housecat)" (2005)
Brandy – "What About Us?" (Felix Da Housecat's Glitz Mix) (2002)
Holly Valance – "State of Mind (Felix Da Housecat's Dub)" (2003)
Madonna – "American Life (Felix Da Housecat's Devin Dazzle Club Mix)" (2003)
Madonna – "Die Another Day (Thee RetroLectro Mix)" (2003)
Miike Snow – "Silvia (Felix Da Housecat Remix)" (2010)
Mylène Farmer – "Je t'aime mélancolie (Felix Da Housecat Remix)" (2003)
Mylo – "Drop the Pressure (Felix Da Housecat Remix)" (2004)
Nina Simone – "Sinnerman (Felix Da Housecat's Heavenly House Mix)" (2003)
Pet Shop Boys – "London (Thee Radikal Blaklight Edit)" (2003)
Pet Shop Boys – "I Don't Know What You Want But I Can't Give It Anymore (Thee 2 Black Ninja Mix) (1999)
New Order – "Here To Stay (Felix Da Housecat Extended Glitz mix)" (2002)
Paola & Chiara – "Vanity & Pride (Felix Da Housecat Club Mix)" (2008)
Uffie – "Pop the Glock (Felix Da Housecat's Pink Enemy Remix)" (2009)
Kylie Minogue – "Where Is The Feeling? (Da Klub Feelin Mix)" (1995)
Diana Ross – "Take Me Higher (I Feel Radical Mix)" (1995)
RAC – "Hollywood Featuring Penguin Prison (Felix Da Housecat Remix)" (2012)
Ali Love – "Another (Felix Da Housecat Remix)" (2013)
Pompeya – "Y.A.H.T.B.M.F. (Felix Da Housecat Heavenly House Mix)" (2014)
Born Dirty and Diplo – "Samba Sujo (Felix Da Housecat and Dave The Hustler Remix)" (2019)

DJ Magazine top 100 DJs

References

External links

Official Website

1971 births
Living people
African-American DJs
American electronic musicians
American house musicians
Record producers from Illinois
Musicians from Chicago
DJs from Chicago
Club DJs
Electronic dance music DJs
Electroclash
Remixers
Alabama State University alumni
21st-century African-American people
20th-century African-American people